Heike Witt is a retired German swimmer who won a silver medal in the 4×100 m freestyle relay at the 1978 World Aquatics Championships. She also won three national titles between 1977 and 1979 in this event.

References

Living people
German female swimmers
East German female freestyle swimmers
World Aquatics Championships medalists in swimming
East German female swimmers
Year of birth missing (living people)